Ioannis Potouridis (born 27 February 1992) is a Greek professional footballer who plays as a centre-back for Greek club Aiolikos.

Club career

Potourídis made has first league appearances for Olympiakos during 2010. He made his debut on the match against Ilioupoli F.C. in the Greek Cup. Ironically, he is most famous in Greece for two costly mistakes he made in a match against Atromitos towards the end of the 2010–2011 season. In the game, Potourídis twice headed the ball directly to Atromitos attackers who scored two goals as Olympiakos embarrassingly lost 3–1.

On 23 November 2011, he substituted on for Rafik Djebbour during Olympiacos' 1–0 victory over Marseille in the Champions League at the Stade Vélodrome, in Group F.

On 10 August 2012, he was loaned to the newly promoted Superleague Greece side Platanias. He made a total of 30 appearances without scoring any goal.
On 15 July 2013, he was sold to Novara Calcio.

A year later he returned to Greece, signing a two years contract with Panthrakikos for an undisclosed fee.
On 30 August 2016, Potouridis signed a three years contract with Greek Super League club AEL. On 17 January 2017, he solved his contract with the club.

On 1 March 2017, Potouridis signed a six months contract with the Polish I liga club Miedź Legnica.

On 31 July 2017, Potouridis signed a year (plus an additional year) contract with Football League club OFI for an undisclosed fee.

Having not played competitively since April 2019, Potouridis signed for South African Premier Division club Cape Town City in late October.

International career
He has represented his country at Under-17 level and has played in the qualifying and elite round of the UEFA Under-17 European Championship.

Honours

Olympiacos
 Superleague:  2010–11, 2011–12
 Greek Cup: 2011–12

References

External links
 Soccerway.com Profile
Guardian's Stats Centre 

Living people
1992 births
Association football central defenders
Greek footballers
Greece youth international footballers
Greece under-21 international footballers
Olympiacos F.C. players
Platanias F.C. players
Novara F.C. players
Panthrakikos F.C. players
Athlitiki Enosi Larissa F.C. players
Miedź Legnica players
OFI Crete F.C. players
Cape Town City F.C. (2016) players
Super League Greece players
Serie B players
I liga players
Football League (Greece) players
Greek expatriate footballers
Expatriate footballers in Italy
Expatriate footballers in Poland
Expatriate soccer players in South Africa
Footballers from Thessaloniki